Jaimee Lambert (born 6 November 1992) is an Australian rules footballer playing for St Kilda in the AFL Women's (AFLW). She has previously played for Western Bulldogs and Collingwood

State league and representative football
Lambert has played Victorian Women's Football League (VWFL) football with the Eastern Devils from 2014 to 2016.
She had previously played with Keysborough in the VWFL's south east division.

Lambert won the Susan Alberti award as the Western Bulldogs best and fairest player in the 2016 AFL exhibition series.

AFL Women's career

Western Bulldogs
She made her league debut in round 1, 2017, against  at VU Whitten Oval. She kicked her first AFLW goal in the match. Lambert missed the Bulldogs' round 2 match, being sidelined due to injury. She returned to the team the following week playing against  at VU Whitten Oval.

Collingwood
Lambert was traded to Collingwood in May 2017. She was packaged with the Bulldogs' first round draft selection (3rd overall) in exchange for the 1st, 4th and 12th picks in the 2017 AFL Women's draft.

Collingwood re-signed Lambert for the 2019 season during the trade period in June 2018.

Lambert has been a hugely influential player at Collingwood. She was awarded the club best and fairest awards in the 2019 season and the 2020 season, as well as being selected for the 2020 AFL Women's All-Australian team. She has also won best and fairests at VFLW level in 2018 and 2019.

Statistics
 Statistics are correct to the end of the S7 (2022) season

|- 
! scope="row" style="text-align:center" | 2017
|
| 2 || 6 || 5 || 2 || 34 || 15 || 49 || 6 || 15 || 0.8 || 0.3 || 5.7 || 2.5 || 8.2 || 1.0 || 2.5 || 0
|- 
! scope="row" style="text-align:center" | 2018
|
| 13 || 7 || 1 || 1 || 75 || 29 || 104 || 19 || 30 || 0.1 || 0.1 || 10.7 || 4.1 || 14.9 || 2.7 || 4.3 || 3
|- 
! scope="row" style="text-align:center" | 2019
|
| 13 || 7 || 3 || 5 || 75 || 34 || 109 || 22 || 37 || 0.4 || 0.7 || 10.7 || 4.9 || 15.6 || 3.1 || 5.3 || 1
|- 
! scope="row" style="text-align:center" | 2020
|
| 13 || 7 || 3 || 3 || 101 || 55 || 156 || 13 || 45 || 0.4 || 0.4 || 14.4 || 7.9 || 22.3 || 1.9 || 6.4 || 7
|- 
! scope="row" style="text-align:center" | 2021
|
| 13 || 11 || 4 || 3 || 124 || 91 || 215 || 25 || 48 || 0.4 || 0.3 || 11.3 || 8.3 || 19.5 || 2.3 || 4.4 || 4
|- 
! scope="row" style="text-align:center" | 2022
|
| 13 || 11 || 4 || 3 || 131 || 92 || 223 || 32 || 66 || 0.4 || 0.3 || 11.9 || 8.4 || 20.3 || 2.9 || 6.0 || 12
|- 
! scope="row" style="text-align:center" | S7 (2022)
|
| 13 || 12 || 2 || 5 || 125 || 71 || 196 || 23 || 53 || 0.2 || 0.4 || 10.4 || 5.9 || 16.3 || 1.9 || 4.4 || 
|- class="sortbottom"
! colspan=3| Career
! 61
! 22
! 22
! 665
! 387
! 1052
! 140
! 294
! 0.4
! 0.4
! 10.9
! 6.3
! 17.2
! 2.3
! 4.8
! 27
|}

References

External links 

1994 births
Living people
Collingwood Football Club (AFLW) players
Western Bulldogs (AFLW) players
Australian rules footballers from Victoria (Australia)
Victorian Women's Football League players